Mrčevo may refer to:
 Mrčevo, Croatia, a village near Dubrovnik, Croatia
 Mrčevo, Montenegro